Laarne Castle (Dutch: Kasteel van Laarne, French: Château de Laerne) is a Belgian moated castle in Laarne, located in the Province of East-Flanders, near its capital city of Ghent. Laarne Castle is situated at an elevation of 3 meters.

Established in the 11th or 12th century to guard the approaches to Ghent from the sea, it was comprehensively renovated in the 17th century.

Since 1953 the castle belongs to the Koninklijke Vereniging der Historische Woonsteden en Hoven van België ("The Royal Association of Historic Residences and Gardens of Belgium"), to whom it was given by the last private owner, the Comte de Ribaucourt (Count of Ribaucourt). It is a protected national monument and is used as a museum.

See also
List of castles in Belgium

Sources

 Website of the Koninklijke Vereniging der Historische Woonsteden en Tuinen van België: Kasteel van Laarne 
 HistorischeHuizen.be: Kasteel van Laarne 

Castles in Belgium
Castles in East Flanders
Museums in East Flanders
Historic house museums in Belgium
Laarne